Cupedora broughami is a species of air-breathing land snail, a terrestrial pulmonate gastropod mollusk in the family Camaenidae.
This species is endemic to Australia.

References 

Gastropods of Australia
broughami
Gastropods described in 1875
Taxa named by George French Angas
Taxonomy articles created by Polbot